Saraswathi Sundaresan Iyer, professionally known as Kumari Sachu (born 7 January 1948) is an Indian actress who has acted in more than 500 films in five different languages and a few television serials. She is a character actress/comedienne who has nonchalantly blended into the roles she has portrayed over five decades. She made her film début in 1953 in the film Rani at the age of 4, and has since then been a prominent face on the silver screen. Since 1995, she has started acting in television serials. In 2012, Sri Krishna Gana Sabha in Chennai, honored Kumari Sachu with the Nadaga Soodamani award.

Early life

Sachu was born into a large family in Mylapore, Chennai, Tamil Nadu. Hailing from an orthodox family of musicians, lawyers and teachers, it was not smooth sailing for the young actress, but her talent acted as the decisive factor. Permission was granted by her lawyer-father. As she teamed up with her sister for Bharatanatyam recitals, her film career forged ahead. Sachu has a sister named Maadi Lakshmi. She was an actress.

Film career

In 1953, Sachu, then less than four years old, was noticed by director A. S. A. Sami (of Velaikkari fame), who was in the process of casting her sister for a dance number. Sami cast her in the Bhanumathi-starrer Rani, and for a scene, she had to cry. But Sachu just did not know how to cry! A quiet pinch did the trick. Then followed the Arignar Anna-scripted Sorga Vaasal. As the younger Paro in Devadasu, her performance was endearing. The chubby-faced Sachu went on to fill the vacuum left by Baby Saroja.

Sachu performed with élan with the legends, be it Bhanumathi, Padmini, Anjali Devi, or Savithri. The evergreen Maya Bazaar was her first 100-day film, and in the film, she played the cherubic Kutti Vatsala (Junior Savithri). Playing the junior version of S. Varalakshmi in "Shyamala" thrilled her no end since it starred the legendary Thyagaraja Bhagavathar. She then took a small break during which she spent the interim perfecting her dance, giving recitals and playing sister roles. Her first film as heroine in Veera Thirumagan with Anandan, screened in 1961.

She was offered to play the role of a comedian and act as Nagesh's pair in the film Kadhalikka Neramillai, This film starred Muthuraman, Nagesh, Kanchana, Rajasree and T. S. Balaiah. After the success of this film, she was put in comedian's role opposite actors like Suruli Rajan, "Thengai" Srinivasan, Cho Ramaswamy, Thangavelu, M. R. Vasu and M. R. Radha in many films from 1964 to 1989. She, Manorama and Jayalalithaa came together to act in 2 classic comedy films - Galata Kalyanam and Bommalattam. Her other notable films include Delhi Mapillai, Thenmazhai, Sorgam, Ooty Varai Oravu, Thunaivan and Meenava Nanban.

The 1970s saw her taking to the stage, and her first play was PVR's Neerottam, where she played the famous Charu. She played a dual role in ARS' Deviyar Iruvar.

Since then, Sachu has been lending her talents out and has successfully starred in over 500 films playing varied roles, and has starred alongside veteran actors such as Sivaji Ganesan, M. G. Ramachandran, Muthuraman, S. A. Ashokan, Nagesh, Suruli Rajan, Thengai Srinivasan, Thangavelu and M. R. Radha.

The late 1970s and 1980s saw her playing supporting roles in films alongside Rajinikanth, Kamal Haasan, Chiranjeevi, and many others, while she has also played mother and grandmother roles to younger actors such as Vijay, Surya, Karthik, Sakthi Vasu and many others.

Television career

She moved on to the small screen since 1995 and has starred in many serials such as Manbumigu Maamiyar, Costly Mappilay, Ananda Bhavan, Dinesh Ganesh and Veetukku Veedu Looty, where she quotes that she had been able to act in roles which she could not in cinema.

She also acted as Vijayakumar's elder sister in the serial Nandini, which aired on Sun TV.

Awards and nominations

A proud moment in Sachu's life was when she received the Kalaimamani award from Chief Minister Jayalalithaa in 1991 and the Thyaga Brahma Gana Sabha award, which was presented by M. S. Subbulakshmi. Also in 2012, Sri Krishna Gana Sabha in Chennai, honoured Kumari Sachu with the Nadaga Soodamani award.

Partial filmography

 Rani — Debut film (1952)
 Shyamala (1952)
 Devadasu (1953)
 Avvaiyar (1953)
Marumagal (1953)
 Sorgavasal (1954)
 Bahut Din Huye (1954)
 Kaveri (1955) - Sandhosham Kollame song dance-as child
Kodeeswaran (1955)- child Artist
 Maya Bazaar (1957)
 Raja Desingu (1960)
 Veera Thirumagan (1962)
 Kalai Arasi (1963)
 Kaadhalikka Neramillai (1964) 
 Inapravugal (1965) - Malayalam film
 Subhaidha (1965) - Malayalam film
 Kalyanayathrayil (1966) - Malayalam film
 Motor sundaram pillai (1966)_ Tamil film
 Thenmazhai (1966)
 Bama Vijayam (1967)
 Ninaivil Nindraval
 Ooty Varai Uravu (1967)
 Delhi Mapillai (1968) as Meghala
 Galatta Kalyanam (1968) as Kaanthã
 Bommalattam (1968) as geetha
 Dial 2244  (1968)  - Malayalam film
 Kallum Kaniyagum(1968)
 Jeevanamsam(1968)- Tamil film
 Vilakkapetta Bandhangal (1969)  - Malayalam film 
 Poova Thalaiya(1969)-Tamil film
Kulavilakku(1969) -Tamil film
Nirai kudam (1969)-Tamil film
Engirundho Vandhal(1970) -Tamil film
 Sorgam (1970)
 Maanavan (1970) as Ramu's wife
Mattukkara velan(1970) as kaveri
 Penn Deivam(1970)- Tamil film
 Uttharavindri Ulle Vaa (1971) as Nurse Sarasa, Mani's lover & Dr. Swamynathan's daughter
 Thenum paalum (1971)- Tamil film 
 Then kinnam (1971)-Tamil film
 Sumathi En sundari(1971)- Tamil film
Kumari kottam (1971)- Tamil film
 Annai Velankanni (1972) as Candle Seller Woman
 Pillaiyo Pillai (1972)
 Dhikku Theriyatha Kaattil (1972)
 Paruva Kaalam (1974)
 Anbu Thangai (1974)
Thai piranthal(1974)-Tamil film
 Vairam (1974)- Tamil film
Athaiya Maamiya( 1974)
Urumaikural(1974)
 Avanthan Manithan (1975)
 Cinema Paithiyam (1975)
 Dheepam (1977)
 Unnai suttrum ulagam(1977)
 Balapareekshanam  (1978)  - Malayalam film 
 Pathinalam Ravu  (1978)  - Malayalam film 
 Ival oru seethai(1978)- Tamil fim 
Anbalippu( 1978)- Tamil film
 Dharma Yuddham (1979)
 Oru vidukadhai oru Thodarkathai (1979) -Tamil film
Kandhar Alangaram(1979)-Tamil film
 Ellam Un Kairasi (1980)
 Sujatha (1980)
 Geetha oru shenbagapoo(1980)-Tamil movie
 Dwanthayudham (1981)  - Malayalam film 
 Oorukku Oru Pillai (1982)
 Solla Thudikuthu Manasu (1988)
 Manasukkul Mathappu (1988) as Nurse Mary
 Naangal (1992)
 Avatharam (1995)
 Tata Birla (1996)
 Priyanka (1994)
 Oomai Vizhigal (1986)
 Unakkaga Ellam Unakkaga (1999)
 Endrendrum Kadhal (1999)
 Priyasakhi (2005)
 Jerry (2006)
 Something Something... Unakkum Enakkum (2006)
 Shankar Dada Zindabad (2007) (Telugu film)
 Sadhu Miranda (2008)
 Ainthaam Padai (2009)
 Aatanayagan (2010)
 Gowravargal (2010)
 Thillu Mullu (2013)
 Naiyaandi (2013)
 Irumbu Kuthirai (2014)
 Gethu (2016)
 Avan Aval (2016)
 Kodi (2016)
 Kadavul Irukaan Kumaru (2016)
 Chennai 600028 II: Second Innings (2016)
 Utharavu Maharaja (2018)
 Perazhagi ISO (2019)
 Ayogya (2019)
 Jackpot (2019)
 Dharala Prabhu (2020) as Kundhavai, Prabhu's grandmother
 Boom Boom Kaalai (2021)
 Veetla Vishesham (2022)
 The Legend (2022)
 Naai Sekar Returns (2022)

References

External links 
 

Living people
Tamil comedians
Tamil actresses
Actresses from Chennai
1948 births
Actresses in Tamil cinema
Actresses in Telugu cinema
Actresses in Malayalam cinema
20th-century Indian actresses
21st-century Indian actresses
Indian film actresses